The Penticton Memorial Arena is a 2,212-seat multi-purpose arena in Penticton, British Columbia. It was home to the Penticton Vees ice hockey team. It was also home of the BC Hockey Hall of Fame (before it moved to the South Okanagan Events Centre), and facilitates Penticton Minor Hockey, the Okanagan Hockey School and the Okanagan Hockey Academy.

References

Indoor arenas in British Columbia
Indoor ice hockey venues in Canada
Buildings and structures in Penticton
Sport in Penticton
Sports venues in British Columbia